Toccoa Creek is a stream in the U.S. state of Georgia.

Toccoa Creek carries Toccoa Falls, a  waterfall.

Toccoa comes from the Cherokee word "Tagwâ′hĭ," meaning "beautiful" or "Catawba place."

References

Rivers of Georgia (U.S. state)
Rivers of Habersham County, Georgia
Rivers of Stephens County, Georgia